Gemma Bond is an English ballet dancer and member of the corps de ballet with American Ballet Theatre (ABT).

Biography
Bond was born in Bedfordshire, England.  She received her early training in dance at the Sylvia Bebb School of Dance in Bedford, before entering professional training at the Royal Ballet School. Whilst training at the school, she danced the role of Zulme in Giselle in the school's annual performance at the Royal Opera House, Covent Garden.  Bond was contracted to The Royal Ballet in 2000 as a member of the corps de ballet, later being promoted to First Artist in 2003.  Bond remained with the Royal Ballet until 2008, when she was invited to join American Ballet Theatre, where she now dances as a member of the corps de ballet. In 2013 she worked with the New York Theater Ballet to choreograph Silent Titles.

Selected Repertoire

Created Roles
 Siren Song - a ballet choreographed by Poppy Ben David, for the Royal Ballet's New Works season

Royal Ballet
 Olga in Onegin, choreographed by John Cranko
 Princess Stephanie in Mayerling, choreographed by Sir Kenneth MacMillan
 Clara in The Nutcracker, choreographed by Sir Peter Wright
 Fairy of the Song Bird in The Sleeping Beauty
 Marie in Anastasia
 Swan Lake, dancing the role of a Cygnet
 La Sylphide, dancing the role of a Sylphide

American Ballet Theatre
 Fairy of Charity in The Sleeping Beauty
 Italian Princess in Swan Lake, also dancing the role of a Cygnet
 Effie in La Sylphide

References

Reviews

External links
 
 Royal Ballet's First Artist Gemma Bond dressed in her costume for the Balanchine Ballet, Jewels (photograph)

American Ballet Theatre dancers
Dancers of The Royal Ballet
English ballerinas
Living people
People from Bedfordshire
Ballet choreographers
1982 births